Topolobampo is a port on the Gulf of California in northwestern Sinaloa, Mexico. It is the fourth-largest town in the municipality of Ahome (after Los Mochis, Ahome, and Higuera de Zaragoza), reporting a 2010 census population of 6,361 inhabitants.

The port connects the northern Mexican states through the Chihuahua-Pacific Railroad, which has a terminus in nearby Los Mochis. It is the eastern port for the daily car ferry connecting to La Paz in Baja California Sur.

Topolobampo is also the beginning of the international trade corridor, "La Entrada al Pacifico", that ends near the Midland-Odessa,  Texas area.

History

Topolobampo was the site of a Radical "utopian" colony inspired by Henry George's economic ideas.  The experiment had an influence on the urban planning ideas of Ebenezer Howard.

That utopian group published a newsletter in English, The Credit Foncier of Sinaloa in Topolobampo. The masthead says "Collective ownership and management for public utilities and conveniences - the community responsible for the health, usefulness, individuality and security of each. - Albert K. Owen." Two pages of one edition (vol. 4, no. 24, September 1, 1889, whole no. 161), has been preserved at Western Reserve Historical Society in Cleveland, Ohio, pasted into a Wallace Cathcart scrapbook on Shakers. Those two pages include an article on the Tyringham, Massachusetts Shakers and correspondence from several prospective members. Evidently the fledgling group hoped to use the reminiscences of Julia Johnson, a former Shaker, to market the concept of a communal society to prospective members.

Climate 

Topolobampo has a tropical arid desert climate.

The sea experiences lows of 19 - 20 °C during the winter months, and highs of 29 - 31 °C during the summer months.

See also
 Naval battles of the Mexican Revolution

References

External links
 Administración Portuaria Integral de Topolobampo 
 Terminal Transoceánica de Topolobampo 
 Municipio de Ahome  Official website of Municipality of Ahome
Topolobampo Collection MSS 106. Special Collections & Archives, UC San Diego Library.

Georgist communities
Populated places in Sinaloa
Port cities and towns on the Mexican Pacific coast